The Kedumim bombing was a suicide bombing which occurred on May 30, 2006 in a vehicle near the Israeli settlement of Kedumim in the West Bank. Four people were killed in the attack.

The Palestinian militant organization Al-Aqsa Martyrs Brigades claimed responsibility for the attack.

The attack
On Thursday, March 30, 2006, at around 21:45, a Palestinian suicide bomber, disguised as an Orthodox Jewish hitchhiker and wearing hidden explosives attached to his body, boarded an Israeli vehicle. The suicide bomber blew himself up near the entrance to the Israeli settlement Kedumim near the gas station outside of the village. The blast killed four Israelis (three inside the car and another person who was near the vehicle).

Aftermath 
In response to the attack, Israeli warplanes destroyed a number of targets in northern Gaza that the IDF claimed were used by Palestinian terrorist organizations for launching rockets into Israel.

References

External links 
 Bomber strikes Israeli settlement - published on BBC News on March 31, 2006
 Suicide bomber kills 4 in West Bank - published on CNN on March 30, 2006
 Four Killed in West Bank Bombing - published on Fox News on March 30, 2006
 West Bank Bomber Kills 4 Israelis - published on the Washington Post on March 31, 2006

Mass murder in 2006
Suicide bombing in the Israeli–Palestinian conflict
Terrorist attacks attributed to Palestinian militant groups
Terrorist incidents in the West Bank in 2006
Terrorist incidents in the Palestinian territories
2006 crimes in the Palestinian territories
March 2006 events in Asia